Boronia albiflora is a plant in the citrus family, Rutaceae and is endemic to the south-west of Western Australia. It is a soft shrub with pinnate leaves and pink or pink and white, four-petalled flowers.

Description
Its leaves are pinnate with between seven and eleven leaflets, the leaflets more or less wedge-shaped and leathery with the edges often turned under. The flowers are pink or pink and white and are borne in leaf axils. The four sepals are lance-shaped to egg-shaped and covered with hairs. The filaments are club-shaped and have a glandular tip. Flowering occurs in most months.

Taxonomy and naming
Boronia albiflora was first formally described in 1863 by George Bentham from an unpublished description by Robert Brown and the description was published in Flora Australiensis. The specific epithet (albiflora) means "white-flowered".

Distribution and habitat
This boronia grows in near coastal areas in southern parts of the south-west of Western Australia, often growing in sandy soils.

Conservation
Boronia albiflora is classified as "not threatened" in Western Australia by the Western Australian Government Department of Parks and Wildlife.

References

albiflora
Flora of Western Australia
Plants described in 1863
Taxa named by George Bentham